USCGC Calhoun (WMSL-759) is the tenth  of the United States Coast Guard. She is the first ship to be named after 1st Master Chief Petty Officer Charles L. Calhoun.

Development and design 

All of Legend-class cutters were constructed by Huntington Ingalls Industries and were part of the Integrated Deepwater System Program. They are of the high endurance cutter roles with additional upgrades to make it more of an asset to the Department of Defense during declared national emergency contingencies. The cutters are armed mainly to take on lightly-armed hostiles in low-threat environments.

Construction and career 
Calhoun and her sister ship  were ordered on 21 December 2018. On 12 November 2019, 100 tons of her steel had been cut. As of July 2021, she was more than halfway through her construction schedule. After the planned ceremony was delayed in 2020, her keel was formally authenticated on 23 July 2021. Calhoun was launched on 2 April 2022 and christened on 4 June 2022.

References

External links

Legend-class cutters
Ships of the United States Coast Guard